Mahmood Abdulrahman Mohammed Noor Abdulrahman (Arabic: محمود عبد الرحمن; born 1984 in Muharraq), also known as Ringo, is a Bahraini footballer. He currently plays for Manama Club as well as the Bahrain national football team. He was named Player of the tournament when Al-Muharraq won the 2008 AFC Cup.

Abdulrahman has made several appearances for the Bahrain national football team, including 14 2010 FIFA World Cup qualifying matches.

Ringo re-joined Muharraq again at 2010, and won the 2010-11 Bahraini Premier League.

International goals 
Scores and results list Bahrain's goal tally first.

References

External links

1984 births
Living people
Bahraini footballers
Bahraini expatriate footballers
Bahrain international footballers
Expatriate footballers in Kuwait
Bahraini expatriate sportspeople in Kuwait
Al-Shamal SC players
Al-Markhiya SC players
Al-Muharraq SC players
Manama Club players
2007 AFC Asian Cup players
2011 AFC Asian Cup players
Footballers at the 2006 Asian Games
Association football midfielders
Asian Games competitors for Bahrain
Qadsia SC players
Kuwait Premier League players